is a railway station  in the town of Shibata, Miyagi Prefecture, Japan, operated by the third-sector railway company AbukumaExpress

Lines

Station layout
The station has two opposed side platforms connected to the station building by a level crossing. The station is unattended.

Adjacent stations

History
The station was renamed to its present name on July 1, 1986, with the establishment of the Abukuma Express.

Surrounding area

 JGSDF Camp Funaoka

See also
 List of Railway Stations in Japan

External links

  

Railway stations in Miyagi Prefecture
Abukuma Express Line
Railway stations in Japan opened in 1968
Shibata, Miyagi